Gunnar Grendstad (born 1 May 1960 in Kristiansand, Norway) is a Norwegian political scientist and professor at the University of Bergen, Norway. He has researched methodological aspects of political science and American politics, and specializes on judicial behavior on the Supreme Court of Norway. He has been a visiting fellow at the University of California, Berkeley and Purdue University.

External links
 Biography from the University of Bergen

1960 births
Academic staff of the University of Bergen
People from Kristiansand
Living people
Norwegian political scientists